The 1968 CONMEBOL Pre-Olympic Tournament took place during March and April 1968. It was the 3rd CONMEBOL Pre-Olympic Tournament.

Argentina and Bolivia did not participate. Brazil and Colombia qualified for the 1968 Summer Olympics.

Group stage

Group 1

Group 2

Final group

Hosted in Brazil and Colombia.

References 

CONMEBOL Pre-Olympic Tournament
1968 in association football
1968 in South America